Isturgia arenacearia, the sand bordered bloom, is a moth of the family Geometridae. It was first described by Michael Denis and Ignaz Schiffermüller in 1775.

Distribution
This species can be found in most of Europe (Sardinia, Corsica, Italy, Switzerland, Slovenia, Austria the Czech Republic, Poland, Slovakia, Hungary, Romania, Serbia and Montenegro, Bulgaria, Albania, North Macedonia, Greece, Crete, Ukraine and Russia) in the eastern Palearctic realm, and in the Near East.

Habitat
These moths inhabit scrubs, dry steppes, xerothermic slopes, meadows and in areas cultivated with alfalfa.

Description

Isturgia arenacearia has a wingspan of 21–27 mm. The basic color of the wings is light brown. The forewings have, in the submarginal area, a darker brown band. A barely visible line is also present, usually with a small dark spot. A series of small dark spots are present along the edge. The hindwings are cream-colored, crossed by a brown line and with small dark spots on the border. All four wings are fringed. The underside of the wings is predominantly gray or light brown. The thorax shows the same color of the wings, while the abdomen and the head are yellow ocher.

Caterpillars are green with thin longitudinal white lines.

This species is rather similar to Isturgia murinaria.

Biology
Adults fly in two generations from June to September. The larvae feed on Coronilla varia, clover (Trifolium species) and various other Fabaceae.

References

External links

"07571 Isturgia arenacearia ([Denis & Schiffermüller], 1775) - Gelblicher Luzernespanner". Lepiforum e.V. Retrieved March 29, 2019.

Moths described in 1775
Macariini
Moths of Japan
Moths of Europe
Moths of Asia
Taxa named by Michael Denis
Taxa named by Ignaz Schiffermüller